The Bank of Commerce and Trust Company Building is a historic building in Downtown Memphis, Tennessee, U.S.. It was built in 1929 for the bank of Commerce and Trust, later known as the National Bank of Commerce (now part of SunTrust Banks).

 Its construction cost $2 million. It was designed by Hanker & Cairns in the Classical Revival architectural style. It has been listed on the National Register of Historic Places since May 7, 1980.

References

National Register of Historic Places in Tennessee
Neoclassical architecture in Tennessee
Buildings and structures completed in 1929
Buildings and structures in Memphis, Tennessee